The mixed doubles tournament at the 1981 French Open was held from 25 May to 7 June 1981 on the outdoor clay courts at the Stade Roland Garros in Paris, France. Jimmy Arias and Andrea Jaeger won the title, defeating Fred McNair and Betty Stöve in the final.

Draw

Finals

Top half

Bottom half

References

External links
1981 French Open – Doubles draws and results at the International Tennis Federation

Mixed Doubles
French Open by year – Mixed doubles